WEYE (104.3 FM, "Eagle 104.3") is a radio station licensed to serve Surgoinsville, Tennessee, United States. The station is owned by Positive Alternative Radio, Inc. It broadcasts a Contemporary Christian format.

The station was assigned the WEYE call letters by the Federal Communications Commission on July 16, 1990.

History

At one time, WEYE was solid gospel format with the name Y-104.3 and an SRN affiliate. As "Eagle 104.3" WEYE was "Home of the Country Legends" with a Classic country format.

References

External links
Official website

Contemporary Christian radio stations in the United States
Hawkins County, Tennessee
EYE